The Virginian (later renamed The Men from Shiloh in its final year) is an American Western television series starring James Drury in the title role, along with Doug McClure, Lee J. Cobb, and others. It originally aired on NBC from 1962 to 1971, for a total of 249 episodes. Drury had played the same role in 1958, in an unsuccessful pilot that became an episode of the NBC summer series Decision. Filmed in color, The Virginian became television's first 90-minute Western series (75 minutes excluding commercial breaks). Cobb left the series after four seasons, and was replaced over the years by mature character actors John Dehner, Charles Bickford, John McIntire, and Stewart Granger, all portraying different characters. It was set before Wyoming became a state in 1890, as mentioned several times as Wyoming Territory, although other references set it later,
around 1898.

The series was loosely based on The Virginian: Horseman of the Plains, a 1902 Western novel by Owen Wister that Hollywood had previously adapted for movies. Percy Faith composed the show's original theme.

The series ran for nine seasons, making it network television's third-longest running Western, behind Bonanza at 14 seasons and 430 episodes, and Gunsmoke at 20 seasons and 635 episodes.

Production
When Revue Productions' hour long series Wagon Train moved from the NBC network to ABC, The Virginian was proposed to replace it. From the beginning, the 90-minute series was filmed in 
Technicolor on 35 mm movie film. The half-hour pilot in 1958 was filmed in black-and-white.

Synopsis

Pilot
The half-hour black and white pilot titled The Virginian aired in 1958 as part of the series Decision, which in other weeks aired pilots for three other series.

In the pilot, unlike in the later series, the Virginian had a noticeable Southern accent and wore a belt buckle marked "CSA", indicating service in the Confederate army. The portrayal of him as a young Civil War veteran would indicate that the time period of the pilot was decades earlier than that of the series. He arrived by invitation at the ranch of Judge Henry (Robert Burton) to be an accountant and manager. He soon becomes involved in unraveling a plot to destroy the judge's efforts to create a new town in the surrounding region. Other actors in the pilot, some of whom appeared in the series years later, included Andrew Duggan, Jeanette Nolan, and Dan Blocker (in a small, nonspeaking role).

Seasons 1-8

Set in the late 19th century, and loosely based on The Virginian, A Horseman of the Plains, a 1902 novel by Owen Wister, the series revolved around the tough foreman of the Shiloh Ranch, played by Drury. His top hand, Trampas (McClure), and he were the only characters to remain with the show for the entire run, although Ross Elliott, as Sheriff Abbott, recurred throughout the run, appearing in 61 episodes over nine years. As in the book, the foreman went only by the name "the Virginian". The series was set in Medicine Bow, Wyoming. Various references in the first season indicate that setting is 1898:
 In episode five, "The Brazen Bell", guest star George C. Scott quotes from Oscar Wilde's The Ballad of Reading Gaol, which was first published in 1898.
 In episode seven, "Riff Raff", several of the main characters join Theodore Roosevelt's Rough Riders, the volunteer cavalry unit formed in 1898 to fight in Cuba during the Spanish–American War.
 In episode 11, "The Devil's Children", the grave marker for one of the characters who dies in the episode states 1898 as the year of death.
 In episode 13, "The Accomplice", an 1898 calendar is present in the bunkhouse.

The series focused on the foreman's quest to maintain an orderly lifestyle at Shiloh Ranch. The ranch was named after the two-day American Civil War Battle of Shiloh, at Pittsburg Landing, Tennessee. The show's white Appaloosa was named Joe D., and Trampas' buckskin horse was named Buck.

Several cast changes were made throughout the program's run. In the first four seasons (1962–1966), the owner of the ranch was Judge Henry Garth (Cobb). His de facto daughter  Betsy (Roberta Shore) lived at the ranch with him, and had a sister relationship with the ranch hands. Ranch hand Steve Hill (Gary Clarke) joined in episode storylines. Randy Boone joined the show in the second season as a youthful ranch hand who played guitar and sang duets with Betsy.

In 1965, Decca Records released an LP of songs from the two singing actors. In the episode "First to Thine Own Self" (February 12, 1964), Boone's character sings "I'm So Lonesome I Could Cry", written by Hank Williams in 1949.

In the third season, Clu Gulager, who had previously guest-starred twice in earlier seasons, was added to the show as deputy Emmett Ryker. At the end of season three, executive producer Frank Price was replaced by Norman Macdonnell. Conversely, season four's production was strained and troublesome. When Shore left the cast, Macdonnell added a new leading woman — Diane Roter, who played Jennifer, the judge's niece. When Cobb left the show in 1966, John Dehner, as Morgan Starr, was brought in as the manager of Shiloh when Judge Garth left to become the governor of Wyoming. His demanding presence and tough demeanor were poorly received.

Producer Frank Price returned for season five. The characters of Randy, Morgan Starr, and Jennifer were subsequently replaced with characters of a more familiar tone. John Grainger (played by Charles Bickford) became the new owner. Elizabeth Grainger (played by Sara Lane), was John Grainger's granddaughter. Her brother Stacey (Don Quine) rounded out this new cast.

Although Price later left again, the series continued smoothly in the pattern he set. Due to Charles Bickford's sudden death in November 1967, season six saw Clay Grainger (John McIntire), take ownership of Shiloh after his brother John's apparent departure "on business".  The sixth season also added Holly Grainger (played by Jeanette Nolan, McIntire's real-life wife, with whom he often worked professionally) as Clay's wife. Season seven had the entrance of David Sutton, played by David Hartman. Sutton was replaced in season eight with a younger hand, Jim Horn (Tim Matheson).

Season 9

In season 9 (1970–71), the name of the program was changed to The Men from Shiloh and the look of the series was completely redesigned. Ownership of the Shiloh Ranch was changed once more, and Colonel Alan MacKenzie (Stewart Granger) took over. Also Lee Majors joined as a new character, Roy Tate, introduced in the fifth episode of the season. Granger said of his character:
They had some idea of Col. Mackenzie against the West. I wanted no part of that. Englishmen were running cattle here from the beginning. The English have this thing for land; for animals and crops... I said this old cocker's out of India and the colonies: he can take the American West on his own terms.
In several countries, including the United Kingdom,  the show went under the extended title The Virginian: Men From Shiloh.

A new opening theme song was composed by Ennio Morricone, and the look of the show was changed reflecting a style similar to spaghetti Westerns, which were popular at the time. The hats worn featured much broader brims and higher crowns. The clothing was also jauntier and more imaginative, and mustaches and beards were more common.

These changes brought a better ranking (number 18) in the top-30 primetime shows, after the previous year had the show slip out of the top-30 rankings for the first time. (It was one of only four Western series on in primetime.)

The final season operated on a "rotating lead actor" basis of the four stars, with normally just one lead appearing each week. Two of the four lead actors (Lee Majors and Doug McClure) never appeared together in the last season. The ranch itself played a very nominal part in season 9, with most scripts featuring the four stars away from the ranch. Little seemingly could save it, as the final season brought in several big guest stars to the remaining episodes. The studio and network were set on ending the series, as evidenced by rivals CBS and ABC making demographic moves away from rural-oriented shows (see "rural purge"). The final episode aired on March 24, 1971, ending the show's nine-season run.

Characters

The Virginian

Played by James Drury, the Virginian was the tough foreman of the Shiloh Ranch. Based loosely on the character in the Owen Wister novel, he always stood his ground firmly. Respected by the town citizens and the hands of the ranch, he was a prominent figure in Medicine Bow. In the series, the Virginian is the ranch foreman from the first episode. This way, the producers were able to establish a feeling that he had been there for a while, thus keeping a consistent story line; this differed from the book, where he was the deputy foreman, eventually promoted to foreman. The Virginian usually wore a black hat, black leather vest, black boots, a maroon red shirt and a single right-handed holster and revolver. He often ordered Monongahela brand whiskey in saloons.

When making the show, the producers chose not to reveal the Virginian's real name, and little about his past was actually made known. This succeeded in making the Virginian an intriguing and mysterious character. The foreman worked under five ranch owners throughout the series: Judge Garth (Lee J. Cobb), Morgan Starr (John Dehner), John Grainger (Charles Bickford), Clay Grainger (John McIntire), and Col. Alan Mackenzie (Stewart Granger). Drury was the only cast member to appear in the pilot (aired as an episode of the series Decision) and the entire nine season run of The Virginian, with McClure the only other cast member to remain with the show for all nine seasons of The Virginian, though not in the initial pilot.

Judge Garth
Lee J. Cobb's Judge Garth was portrayed as a stern man with a soft side to his personality, acting as a father figure to the Virginian. Respected by all the townspeople as well as his employees, Garth was often looked to as mediator for certain matters. Cobb left the series near the end of season four. In the episode "Morgan Starr", the character was stated to have left Shiloh to become governor of Wyoming. Garth had previously said he would leave Shiloh to his daughter Betsy in "The Hero" (season three, episode four).

Trampas
Played by Doug McClure, the character of Trampas took on a completely different personality from the character in the novel. In Wister's book, Trampas was a villain throughout the story and at the end was shot by the Virginian. In the series, producers chose to make Trampas a fun-loving and rowdy character; McClure fit the part perfectly. Trampas, a sandy-haired, rowdy cowhand who eventually settled down on the ranch, was by far the most developed character in the series, as compared to the minimal history on the title character.  Several episodes were made detailing his past. McClure added a touch of light comedy to the series to counterbalance the Virginian's serious manner.  For part of season 9, the Trampas character wore a thick mustache and broader brimmed hat.

Steve Hill
Played by Gary Clarke, Steve was a good friend of both Trampas' and the Virginian's. He was constantly getting Trampas in and out of his usual scrapes. The on-screen chemistry that Gary Clarke and Doug McClure possessed reflected their good friendship off screen, and was loved by fans worldwide. Although he was with the show at the beginning, Clarke was being phased out of the show at the end of season two, but remained as a guest star for a few episodes in season three, before departing for good.

Betsy Garth
Played by Roberta Shore from seasons 1-4, Betsy was the only daughter of Judge Garth. Early in the series, she was made clear to be adopted, but nevertheless, the judge treated her as his own. Betsy and the ranch hands had a sort of brother–sister relationship. Trampas and Steve had a particular soft spot for her, often jumping to protect her, and looking out for her wellbeing. At the start of the series, Betsy was said to be 15 years old. In a season-four episode, "The Awakening", she married a minister (Glenn Corbett), and moved to Pennsylvania, reflecting Shore's departure from the show.

Randy Benton
Played by Randy Boone from seasons 2-4, Randy was a young ranch hand who played guitar and sang. He came into the show as Steve Hill was being phased out as a regular cast member. Before the new Grainger family was brought in for season five, his character was discontinued.

Deputy Sheriff Emmett Ryker
At the beginning of season three, a new cast regular was introduced. Clu Gulager played the restless deputy Emmett Ryker. Ryker was the first cast regular not to live on Shiloh. A former lawman turned hired gun, because the pay was better, Ryker decided to settle in Medicine Bow before he took his new profession too far. He was hired by Sheriff Abbott, with whom he had been acquainted, after solving the murder of a prominent rancher in the introductory episode "Ryker". He became the sheriff in season four.  Gulager remained with the show for four seasons, leaving briefly at the beginning of season five, then returning for the rest of season five before leaving for good toward the end of season six.

Jennifer Sommers
After Roberta Shore's departure, Diane Roter was brought in as the judge's niece. At the end of season four, along with Boone and Dehner, she left, making room for the new owners.

Morgan Starr
Halfway through season four, Morgan Starr was brought in to run the ranch for Judge Garth because of Garth's appointment as governor of Wyoming. John Dehner played a tough and demanding man, who was hard to befriend, as the Virginian and Trampas soon found out. Fans disliked Dehner's character, and he left the show at the end of the season.

John Grainger
At the beginning of season five, with Judge Garth, Betsy, and Jennifer gone, a new character was brought in to run Shiloh. Charles Bickford played a stern but loving grandfather to his two grandchildren, Stacey and Elizabeth. Although the Virginian and Mr. Grainger never quite had the father–son relationship that the Virginian and Judge Garth had, they got along well. Charles Bickford's death on November 9, 1967, was a shock to the cast. He was replaced by John McIntire as his brother Clay.

Stacey Grainger
Played by Don Quine, Stacey Grainger, the grandson of John Grainger, lived at Shiloh, beginning in season five. He worked alongside Trampas, and the two become good friends. Stacey's sister Elizabeth looked up to him as a big brother, and he filled the role more than competently. Quine's two seasons on The Virginian were the only ones that finished in the Nielsen rating top-15 yearend rankings.

Elizabeth Grainger
Stacey's younger sister Elizabeth (Sara Lane) was the granddaughter of John Grainger, starting in season five. Trampas, the Virginian, and Stacey all look out for her wellbeing. Elizabeth was cast as a teenaged girl enjoying her life on the frontier. She loved horses, riding the range, and going to the ever-present Saturday-night dances. Sara Lane left the series in season eight.

Clay Grainger
After the death of Charles Bickford, John McIntire was hired as his brother, Liz and Stacey's great uncle. Clay had a wife, Holly (Jeanette Nolan), and was the ranch owner for seasons five through eight. McIntire had earlier taken over the lead role in Wagon Train upon the death of Ward Bond, assuming the role of the new wagonmaster. In season 9, The Virginian was revamped, and McIntire, along with Nolan, Lane, David Hartman, and Tim Matheson, left the show.

Episodes

The Virginian aired Wednesday at 7:30–9:00 pm on NBC for its entire run.

Guest stars
Well-known guest stars from film and television included Claude Akins, Eddie Albert, Lloyd Bochner, Charles Bronson, Robert Culp, Joan Crawford, Jim Davis, Bette Davis, Troy Donahue, Patty Duke, Robert Duvall, Nina Foch, Harrison Ford, James Gregory, Pat Hingle, Robert Lansing, Jack Lord, Lee Marvin, Eve McVeagh, Vera Miles,Ricardo Montalbán, Martin Milner, Leonard Nimoy, Edmond O'Brien, Ryan O'Neal, Slim Pickens, Robert Redford, John Saxon, George C. Scott, William Shatner, Franchot Tone, Tom Tryon, James Whitmore, Peter Whitney, Kurt Russell, and William Windom.

Season one
The first episode "The Executioners", features Hugh O'Brian. It also included Jack Warden (episode 1.3, "Throw a Long Rope"), Ricardo Montalbán (episode 1.4, "The Big Deal"), Aldo Ray (episode 1.6, "Big Day, Great Day"), Lee Marvin (episode 1.9, "It Tolls for Thee"), Charles Bickford, Joan Freeman, and Charles Aidman (episode 1.11, "The Devil's Children"), Bette Davis, Harold Gould (episode 1.13, "The Accomplice"), Carol Lynley (1.14, "The Man from the Sea"), Brian Keith (1.15, "Duel at Shiloh"), Vera Miles  (1.16, "The Exiles"), (1.17, The Judgment) Clu Gulager (1.19, "The Man Who Wouldn't Die"), David Wayne (1.21, "The Small Parade"), John Dehner (1.26, "Echo of Another Day"), Paul Richards, Skip Homeier, Arthur Hunnicut, Richard Anderson, and Harry Morgan (1.27, "Strangers at Sundown"), and Dolores Hart (1.30, "The Mountain of the Sun").

Season two 
The first episode of season two ("Ride a Dark Trail") featured Royal Dano. After that, such stars as Broderick Crawford (2.4, "A Killer in Town"), Robert Redford (2.5, "The Evil That Men Do"), Albert Salmi (2.7, "Brother Thaddeus"), Warren Oates (2.10, "Stopover in a Western Town"), Yvonne De Carlo (2.12, "A Time Remembered"), Leonard Nimoy and DeForest Kelley (2.14, "A Man Of Violence"), Leo Genn (2.18, "The Thirty Days of Gavin Heath"), Bruce Dern (2.20, "First to Thine Own Self"), John Agar, Sheree North, Dennis Holmes, and Ross Elliott (2.24, "Another's Footsteps"), and Peter Breck and Bruce Dern (2.25, "Rope of Lies") were listed.

Season three
With season three, a new cast regular was introduced. Clu Gulager played the young deputy Emmett Ryker, but even with the expanding cast, more guest stars were brought on to the show. In the first episode, (3.1, "Ryker") in which Gulager was introduced, Leslie Nielsen played a corrupt land grabber. Other actors included Victor Jory and Katharine Ross (3.2, "Dark Challenge"), Robert Culp and Jena Engstrom (3.3, "The Stallion"), Steve Forrest, (3.4, "The Hero"), Mariette Hartley (3.5, "Felicity's Spring", a popular episode in which The Virginian is almost wed), Barbara Eden (3.6, "The Brazos Kid"), young Kurt Russell (3.8, "A Father For Toby"), George Kennedy (3.12, "A Gallows For Sam Horn"), John Gavin (3.13, "Portrait of a Widow"), and Lloyd Nolan (3.14, "The Payment"). Following the switch to Universal Studios from Revue, Fabian Forte starred as a young man suffering from schizophrenia in Episode 3.17, "Two Men Named Laredo". Others included Forrest Tucker and Andrew Prine (3.18, "Hideout"), Warren Oates (3.21 "A Slight Case of Charity"), Jack Warden (3.23, "Shadows of the Past"), Tom Simcox (3.26, "Dangerous Road"), Rhonda Fleming, William Smith, Neville Brand, and Peter Brown (3.30, "We've Lost a Train"). ("We've Lost a Train" also served as the pilot episode for the series Laredo.).

Season four
Susan Oliver, Albert Salmi and Bruce Dern guest starred in episode 4.3, "A Little Learning". William Shatner played an old buddy of Trampas' in episode 4.4, "The Claim". Glenn Corbett played a young minister who marries Betsy in episode 4.5, "The Awakening". Others included Earl Holliman (4.6, "Ring of Silence"), Charles Bronson (4.8, "Nobility of Kings"), Leonard Nimoy (4.9, "Show Me a Hero"), Harold J. Stone (4.12, "The Laramie Road"), James Best (4.14, "Letter of the Law"), Telly Savalas (4.17, "Men With Guns"), John Cassavetes (4.18, "Long Ride to Wind River"), Tony Bill (4.19, "Chaff in the Wind"), John Dehner (4.21, "Morgan Starr"), Warren Oates (4.24 "One Spring Like Long Ago") and Andrew Duggan (4.29, "A Bald Faced Boy").

Season five 
At the start of season five, three new cast regulars were introduced, the Grainger family. Guest stars included Angie Dickinson, Warren Oates (5.2, "Ride to Delphi"), Aldo Ray (5.5, "Jacob Was a Plain Man"), Dan Duryea (5.6, "The Challenge"), Diane Baker and Frank McGrath (5.12, "Linda"), Pernell Roberts (5.13, "The Long Way Home"), Tom Tryon (5.14, "The Girl on the Glass Mountain"), Andy Devine (5.17, "Yesterday's Timepiece"), Harrison Ford (5.19, "The Modoc Kid"), Michael Shea (5.25, "Bitter Harvest"), Robert Fuller (5.26, "A Welcoming Town"), Vivi Janiss and R. G. Armstrong (5.27, "The Girl on the Pinto"), and Myrna Loy (5.28, "The Lady of the House").

Season six
Season six featured Charles Bronson and Dick Foran in 6.1, "The Reckoning". It then continued with David Hartman (6.6, "Masquerade"), Edmond O'Brien (6.7, "Ah Sing vs. Wyoming"), Jeanette Nolan (6.8, "Bitter Autumn"), John McIntire (6.9, "A Bad Place to Die"), James Whitmore (6.10, "Paid in Full"), Malachi Throne (6.11, "To Bear Witness"), John Lupton (6.13, "Execution at Triste"), Susan Oliver (6.14, "A Small Taste of Justice"), Tim McIntire (6.16, "The Death Wagon"), Sammy Jackson (6.17, "Jed"), Peter Deuel (6.20, "The Good-Hearted Bad Man"), and Michael Burns (6.26, "Seth"). In episode 6.8, "Bitter Autumn", John McIntire was brought in as the brother of John Grainger. (Charles Bickford was gravely ill at the time.) McIntire was added to the cast ride-in in episode 6.17, "Jed".

Season seven 
Season seven's guests included William Smith (7.2, "Silver Image"), Burgess Meredith (7.3, "The Orchard"), John Saxon (7.4, "A Vision of Blindness"), Ricardo Montalbán (7.5, "The Wind of Outrage"), Susan Oliver (7.9, "The Storm Gate"), Hugh Beaumont (7.12, "Nora"), Steve Ihnat (7.16, "Last Grave at Socorro Creek"), James Brolin (7.17, "Crime Wave in Buffalo Springs"), Peter Deuel (7.18, "The Price of Love"), Jennifer Gan (7.19, "The Ordeal"), Jack Albertson (7.24, The Girl In The Shadows"), Troy Donahue (7.25, "Fox, Hound, And The Widow McCloud"), and Shelly Novack (7.26, "The Stranger").

Season eight
Season eight had the return of William Shatner (8.14, "Black Jade"), along with Joan Crawford (8.16, "Nightmare"), Tony Franciosa (8.17, "Holocaust"), Patrick Macnee (8.21, "A King's Ransom"), Tim McIntire and Terry Wilson (8.22, "The Sins of the Fathers"), and Julie Gregg (8.24, "The Gift")

Season nine
Guest stars in the final season included Desi Arnaz and Katy Jurado (9.2, "The Best Man"); Janet Leigh (9.3, "Jenny"); Anne Francis (9.6, "Gun Quest"); Susan Strasberg (9.7, "Crooked Corner"); Noah Beery Jr. (9.11, "Follow the Leader"); James Gregory and Ricardo Montalbán (9.12, "Last of the Comancheros"); Susan Oliver, Lisa Gerritsen and Peter Breck (9.13, "Hannah"); Terry Wilson and Tom Skerritt (9.14, "Nan Allen") (Wilson also appeared two other times  -9.21 "The Regimental Line" and 9.23 "Wolf Track"); Randolph Mantooth (9.21 "The Regimental Line"); Robert Fuller, Burgess Meredith, and Tisha Sterling (9.19 "Flight from Memory"); Michael Burns, Ross Elliott, Alan Hale, Jr., Peter Mark Richman, and Craig Stevens (9.20 "Tate, Ramrod"); and Lloyd Bochner, Howard Duff, L.Q. Jones, and Peter Lawford (9.22 "The Town Killer"). The series ended with episode 9.24, "Jump-Up".

Reception
The Virginian prevailed or held steady against its network competition, topping in its first season Dwayne Hickman's The Many Loves of Dobie Gillis, which ceased production in 1963. In its fifth season, The Virginian faced competition from another Western, one also set in Wyoming: ABC's The Monroes, starring Michael Anderson Jr. and Barbara Hershey as orphans trying to hold their family of siblings together in the wilderness. In its sixth season, The Virginian also rated higher than ABC's Custer starring Wayne Maunder in the title role of Lieutenant Colonel George Armstrong Custer. Custer was cancelled late in 1967 after 17 episodes. The Virginian had these rankings in the top-30 TV programs:

Ratings

Legacy
Drury was an active advocate of the series since the end of the original airings. He traveled across the United States, Ireland, and several other countries, appearing in Western-themed conventions, festivals, celebrations, news programs, and TV specials to promote The Virginian. Along with Gary Clarke and Roberta Shore, he participated in interviews for the Encore Westerns channel. Drury also reunited with key cast members Randy Boone, Gary Clarke, and Roberta Shore at these events.

In 2012, Drury also reunited with L.Q. Jones, Clu Gulager, Diane Roter, Sara Lane, and Don Quine in addition to Boone, Clarke, and Shore. Three events were held to celebrate the 50th anniversary of The Virginian, at the Memphis Film Festival on May 31, 2012, the Western Legends Roundup on August 16, 2012, and the Autry National Center and Museum on September 22, 2012. During the 50th-anniversary event, INSP, the exclusive cable home to current reruns of "The Virginian" filmed content with the surviving cast to use in the "Cast Favorites Marathon", which continues to be aired several times each year.  In 2017, INSP began airing The Men From Shiloh during their Saddle Up Weekends programming block.

Filming locations
 Western streets in the backlot of Universal City, California
 Iverson Movie Ranch, Chatsworth, California
 Lone Pine, California
 Pollock Pines, California (Ghost Mountain Ranch)
 Bronson Canyon, Griffith Park Los Angeles, California
 CBS Studio Center Los Angeles
 Albertson Movie Ranch, Ventura County, California

Spin-offs
In April 1965, an episode of The Virginian called "We've Lost a Train" served as a backdoor pilot for the TV series Laredo.

Syndication
The cable channels of Encore Westerns, MoviePlex, and RetroPlex began airing complete, uncut commercial free episodes of The Virginian starting with a premier marathon in January 2010 and ending in December 2011. Seasons one through eight were shown.

The Inspiration Network cable channel began a three-year agreement to run The Virginian starting with a marathon of episodes on September 22, 2012, to celebrate the 50th anniversary of the show. Cozi TV, the NBCUniversal classic television digital specialty network, began airing episodes in 2013. The show later returned to Encore Westerns and continues to air every weekday; a marathon of Drury-centric episodes was run shortly after his death in April 2020.

Home media
Timeless Media Group (under license from NBCUniversal) has released all seasons of The Virginian on DVD in Region 1.  All episodes on all releases have been fully restored and digitally remastered in full color and are available in special collectors' edition tin cases. They also each include a bonus disk with interviews from the actors.

Euro Video of Germany released season one, part one, in Germany, on October 14, 2010. Season one, part two, was released June 16, 2011. The release is presented with original English audio with German subtitles, as well as a German-dubbed soundtrack.

Acorn Media UK released the first season of The Virginian on DVD in the UK on April 4, 2011. The DVD also contains an interview with James Drury.

Translations of the title
 Germany : Die Leute von der Shiloh Ranch
 French : Le Virginien
 Spanish : El Virginiano
 Swedish: Mannen från Virginia
 Finnish: Virginialainen

See also
 1962–63 United States network television schedule

References

Further reading
 A History of Television's The Virginian 1962–1971 by Paul Green, with a foreword by former executive producer Frank Price, (2006) 
 The Virginian: A Horseman of the Plains by Owen Wister. (1902)

External links

 
 James Drury The Virginian Official Website
 "The only Authorized Fan site" of Don Quine, Stacey Grainger on "The Virginian"

1960s Western (genre) television series
1962 American television series debuts
1970s Western (genre) television series
1971 American television series endings
English-language television shows
NBC original programming
Television series by Universal Television
Television shows set in Wyoming